Five ships of the Royal Navy have borne the name HMS Kingston.

  was a 60-gun fourth rate, launched in 1697, rebuilt in 1719 and 1740 and sold in 1762. Destroyed in 1763 whilst serving as the privateer Lord Clive.
 HMS Kingston was previously , a 56-gun fourth rate launched in 1814. She was renamed HMS Kingston later in 1814 and was sold in 1832.
  was a schooner, formerly the slaver Caries.
  was a K-class destroyer launched in 1939 and wrecked in an air attack in 1942. The hull was subsequently used as a blockship.

See also
 , a  launched in 1995 and currently in service with the Royal Canadian Navy.

Royal Navy ship names